Chrysostoma paradoxum, common name the orange-mouthed top shell, is a species of sea snail, a marine gastropod mollusk in the family Trochidae, the top snails.

Description
The length of the shell varies between 18 mm and 21 mm. The globular shell is imperforate or nearly so, thick and strong, with a porcelaneous texture. The surface of the shell is smooth, with scarcely visible lines of growth. The upper whorls are microscopically, and densely, spirally striated. The color of the shell is whitish, closely reticulated and mottled all over with red or pinkish, often with a few large darker maculations above. The spire is very short. The sutures are linear. They are bordered by a slight concavity of the whorl or margination. The six whorls are convex, the last globular. The aperture is half-moon shaped and has a reddish or golden-orange color within. The parietal wall is covered with a very thick orange-colored (rarely crimson) callus, which projects in a short tongue-shaped lobe above the slight, often closed, umbilical perforation.

Distribution
This marine species occurs on corals in the intertidal zone of the East China Sea, off the Philippines, Japan, New Caledonia and Queensland, Australia.

References

 Crosse, H., 1866. Note complémentaire sur l'opercule du Chrysostoma nicobaricum . J. de Conch., 14:116-117
 Troschel, F.H., 1879. Das Gebiss der Schnecken, zur Begründung einer Natürlichen Classification [by J. Thiele]. Nicolaische Verlagsbuchhandlung, Berlin. 237.
 Watson, R.B., 1886 [31/Dec/1886]. Report of the Scaphopoda and Gastropoda. Rep. Scient. Res. Voy. HMS Challenger 1873-76.zoology, 15(42):0-0
 Schepman, M.M., 1908 [31/Dec/1908]. Prosobranchia (excluding Heteropoda and parasitic Prosobranchia). Rhipidoglossa and Docoglossa. With an appendix by Prof. R. Bergh [Pectinobranchiata].. Siboga Expedition, 49(1):1-1089
 Allan, J., 1950. Australian Shells, with related animals living in the sea, in freshwater and on the land. Georgian House, Melbourne. xix 470 pp
 MacNeil, F.S., 1960. Tertiary and Quaternary Gastropoda of Okinawa. U.S. Geol. S. Professional Pa., 339:0-0.
 Rippingale, O.H. & McMichael, D.F., 1961. Queensland and Great Barrier Reef Shells. Jacaranda Press, Brisbane. 210 pp.
 Habe, T., 1964. Shells of the Western Pacific in color II. Hoikusha, Osaka. 66 pls, 233.
 Hinton, A., 1972. Shells of New Guinea and the Central Indo-Pacific. Jacaranda Press, Milton
 Coleman, N., 1981. What shell is that ? Lansdowne Press, Sydney. 1-298.
 Wilson, B., 1993. Australian Marine Shells. Prosobranch Gastropods. Odyssey Publishing, Kallaroo, WA

External links
 Gastropods.com: Chrysostoma nicobaricus

External links
 To Biodiversity Heritage Library (24 publications)
 To Encyclopedia of Life
 To GenBank (4 nucleotides; 1 proteins)
 To USNM Invertebrate Zoology Mollusca Collection
 To World Register of Marine Species

paradoxum
Gastropods described in 1778